The 2022 season was Polis Di-Raja Malaysia Football Club's 32nd in existence and 13rd in the second-tier of Malaysian football. The club competed in Malaysia Premier League, the Malaysia FA Cup and the Malaysia Cup.

Players

First-team squad

(captain)

Transfers in

Transfers out

Competitions

Malaysia Premier League

Malaysia FA Cup

Malaysia Cup

Round of 16

Statistics

Appearances and goals

|-
! colspan="18" style="background:#dcdcdc; text-align:center"| Goalkeepers

|-
! colspan="18" style="background:#dcdcdc; text-align:center"| Defenders

|-
! colspan="18" style="background:#dcdcdc; text-align:center"| Midfielders

|-
! colspan="18" style="background:#dcdcdc; text-align:center"| Forwards

|-
! colspan="18" style="background:#dcdcdc; text-align:center"| Players transferred out during the season

|-

References

PDRM
PDRM FA